Brenden is a given name and a surname. Notable people with the name include:

Given name
Brenden Aaronson (born 2000), American professional soccer player
Brenden Abbott (born 1962), convicted Australian bank robber
Brenden Bissett (born 1993), Canadian field hockey player
Brenden Dillon (born 1990), Canadian ice hockey player
Brenden Foster (1997–2008), founder of the Brenden Foster Food Drive
Brenden Fourie (born 1970), South African former cricketer
Brenden Hall, disabled swimmer from Australia
Brenden Jaimes (born 1999), American football player
Brenden Jefferson (born 1986), American film and television actor and songwriter
Brenden Jones (born 1974), American politician and entrepreneur
John Brenden Kelly, Sr. (1889–1960), aka Jack Kelly, American triple Olympic champion
Brenden Kichton (born 1992), Canadian ice hockey player
Synnøve Brenden Klemetrud (born 1959), Norwegian politician
Brenden Margieson, aka Margo, (born 1972), former Australian professional surfer
Brenden Morrow (born 1979), Canadian ice hockey player
Brenden Olivier (born 1992), South African rugby union player
Brenden Pappas (born 1970), South African golfer
Brenden Sander (born 1995), American volleyball player
Brenden Santi (born 1993), Italy international rugby league footballer
Brenden Schooler (born 1997), American football player
Brenden Shucart (aka Brenden Gregory), American HIV/AIDS and LGBT rights activist
Brenden Stai (born 1972), American football player
Brenden Thenhaus (born 1986), Canadian lacrosse player

Surname
Erik Næsbak Brenden (born 1994), Norwegian footballer
Hallgeir Brenden (1929–2007), Norwegian former cross-country skier from Tørberget in Trysil
John Brenden, Republican member of the Montana Legislature
Kristian Brenden (born 1976), retired Norwegian ski jumper
Laila Brenden (born 1956), Norwegian author
Marie Brenden (born 1938), Norwegian politician for the Labour Party

See also
Saint Brendan High School, co-educational private Roman Catholic high school in Florida
Branden (disambiguation)
Brandon (disambiguation)
Brendan
Brendon
Brundon
Brändön